94 (ninety-four) is the natural number following 93 and preceding 95.

In mathematics
94 is:

the twenty-ninth distinct semiprime and the fourteenth of the form (2.q).
the ninth composite number in the 43-aliquot tree. The aliquot sum of 94 is 50 within the aliquot sequence (94,50,43,1,0).
the second number in the third triplet of three consecutive distinct semiprimes, 93, 94 and 95.
a 17-gonal number and a nontotient.
an Erdős–Woods number, since it is possible to find sequences of 94 consecutive integers such that each inner member shares a factor with either the first or the last member.
a Smith number in decimal.

In computing 
The ASCII character set (and, more generally, ISO 646) contains exactly 94 graphic non-whitespace characters, which form a contiguous range of code points. These codes (0x21–0x7E, as corresponding high bit set bytes 0xA1–0xFE) also used in various multi-byte encoding schemes for languages of East Asia, such as ISO 2022, EUC and GB 2312. For this reason, code pages of 942 and even 943 code points were common in East Asia in 1980s–1990s.

In astronomy
Messier 94, a spiral galaxy in the constellation Canes Venatici
The New General Catalogue object NGC 94, a galaxy in the constellation Andromeda

In other fields
Ninety-four is:

The atomic number of plutonium, an actinide.
 The designation of STS-94 Space Shuttle Columbia launched July 1, 1997
The code for international direct dial phone calls to Sri Lanka.
Part of the model number of
AN-94, a Russian assault rifle.
M-94, a piece of cryptographic equipment used by the United States army in use from 1922 to 1943.
The number of Haydn's Surprise Symphony (Symphony No. 94).
Used as a nonsense number by the British satire magazine Private Eye. Most commonly used in spoof articles end halfway through a sentence with "(continued p. 94)". The magazine never extends to 94 pages: this was originally a reference to the enormous size of some Sunday newspapers.
Each February, Respiratory Health Association of Metropolitan Chicago hosts Hustle Up the Hancock, a race up 94 floors of the John Hancock Center in Chicago to raise more than $1 million for lung disease research and programs."
The 94th Fighter Squadron is a squadron of the United States Air Force, currently part of the 1st Operations Group of the 1st Fighter Wing, and stationed at Langley Air Force Base in Virginia
 The 94th Infantry Division was a unit of the United States Army in World War II, activated September 15, 1942.
 Saab 94 was the model number Saab unofficially used for the first generation Saab Sonett
 Form I-94 is the form used to declare to US Customs Officers by international travelers the items in their possession, purpose of visit, etc.
 The number of the French department Val-de-Marne

In sports
 Pascal Wehrlein, who drove for Sauber in Formula One in 2017, chose the number 94.

See also
 List of highways numbered 94

References 

Integers
Private Eye